Eirin Maria Kvandal (born 12 December 2001) is a Norwegian ski jumper.

Career
She represents the club Mosjøen IL. She competed at the Junior World Championships in 2018 and 2020, winning a silver medal from the mixed team competition at the latter championship. She made her Continental Cup debut in December 2018, and managed two top-10 placements in January and February 2020.

She made her World Cup debut in December 2020 in Ramsau, finishing 33rd. In her next individual event, January 2021's normal hill in Ljubno, she won the race.

World Cup

Standings

Individual wins

Individual starts (7)

References

External links

2001 births
Living people
People from Vefsn
Norwegian female ski jumpers
Sportspeople from Nordland
21st-century Norwegian women
FIS Nordic World Ski Championships medalists in ski jumping